Storhøe is a mountain in Dovre Municipality in Innlandet county, Norway. The mountain is surrounded by several other notable mountains including Gråhøe and Halvfarhøe to the northeast, Falketind and Blåberget to the north , and Fokstuguhøi to the west.

See also
List of mountains of Norway

References

Dovre
Mountains of Innlandet